Chhelu Ram VC (10 May 1905 – 20 April 1943) was an Indian recipient of the Victoria Cross, the highest and most prestigious award for gallantry in the face of the enemy that can be awarded to British and Commonwealth forces. He was born to Ch Jiram Garhwal in a Jat family in Dinod village near Bhiwani then part of Hisar district of undivided Punjab.

Death

He was 37 years old, and a Company Havildar-Major in the 4/6th Rajputana Rifles, in the Indian Army during World War II when he performed the following deed for which he was awarded the VC.

On the night of 1920 April 1943 at Djebel Garci, Tunisia, the advance of a battalion of the 5th Indian Infantry Brigade was held up by machine-gun and mortar fire. He gave the rallying cry  [Jats and Mohammedans, there must be no withdrawal! We will advance! Advance!] while attacking. Company Havildar-Major Chhelu Ram dashed forward with a Tommy-gun, killed the occupants of a machine-gun post, and then went to the aid of his company commander who had become a casualty. While doing so he was himself wounded, but taking command of the company, he led them in hand-to-hand fighting. He was again wounded, but continued rallying his men until he died.

References

External links

 Chhelu Ram
 

1905 births
1943 deaths
Indian World War II recipients of the Victoria Cross
British Indian Army soldiers
Indian Army personnel killed in World War II
People from Punjab, India
Burials at Sfax War Cemetery
Military personnel of British India